Diaphragm valves (or membrane valves) consists of a valve body with two or more ports, an elastomeric diaphragm, and a "weir or saddle" or seat upon which the diaphragm closes the valve. The valve body may be constructed from plastic, metal, wood or other materials depending on the intended use.

Categories

There are two main categories of diaphragm valves: one type seals over a "weir" (saddle) and the other (sometimes called a "full bore or straight-through" valve) seals over a seat. In general, straight-through diaphragm valves are used in on-off applications and weir-type diaphragm valves are used for control or throttling applications. While diaphragm valves usually come in two-port forms (2/2-way diaphragm valve), they can also come with three ports (3/2-way diaphragm valves also called T-valves) and more (so called block-valves). When more than three ports are included, they generally require more than one diaphragm seat; however, special dual actuators can handle more ports with one membrane.

Diaphragm valves can be manual or automated. Automated diaphragm valves may use pneumatic, hydraulic or electric actuators along with accessories such as solenoid valves, limit switches and positioners.

In addition to the well known, two way shut off or throttling diaphragm valve, other types include: Three way zero deadleg valve, sterile access port, block and bleed, valbow and tank bottom valve.

Valve body 
Many diaphragm valve body dimensions follow the Manufacturers Standardization Society MSS SP-88 However, most non-diaphragm valves used in industrial applications are built to the ANSI/ASME B16.10 standard. standard. The different standards makes it difficult to use diaphragm valves as an alternative to most other industrial valves. Some manufacturers offer diaphragm valves that conform to ANSI B16.10 standards thereby making these diaphragm valves interchangeable with most solid wedge, double disc, and resilient wedge gate valves as well as short pattern plug and ball valves.

Actuators 

Diaphragm valves can be controlled by various types of actuators e.g. manual, pneumatic, hydraulic, electric etc.  The most common diaphragm valves use pneumatic actuators; in this type of valve, air pressure is applied through a pilot valve into the actuator which in turn raises the diaphragm and opens the valve.  This type of valve is one of the more common valves used in operations where valve speed is a necessity.

Hydraulic diaphragm valves also exist for higher pressure and lower speed operations.  Many diaphragm valves are also controlled manually.

Body materials 

 Brass
 Steel type: 
Cast Iron
Ductile iron
Carbon Steel
Stainless Steel
Alloy 20
 Plastic type:
ABS (Acrylonitrile butadiene styrene)
PVC-U (Polyvinyl chloride, unplasticized) also known as PVCu or uPVC
PVC-C (Polyvinyl chloride, post chlorinated) also known as PVCc or cPVC
PP (Polypropylene)
PE (Polyethylene) also known as LDPE, MDPE and HDPE (see note)
PVDF (Polyvinylidene fluoride)
PTFE
PFA

Body lining materials 

Depending on temperature, pressure and chemical resistance, one of the following is used:

 Unlined type
 Rubber lined type:
 NR/Hard Rubber/Ebonite,
 BR/Soft rubber
 EPDM
BUNA-N
Neoprene
Fluorine plastic lined type
 FEP
 PFA
 PO
 PP
 Tefzel
 KYNAR
 XYLON
 HALAR
Glass Lined (Green Glass or Blue Glass)

Diaphragm materials 

 Unlined or Rubber Lined Type:
 NR/Natural Rubber
 NBR/Nitrile/Buna-N
 EPDM
 FKM/Viton
BUNA-N
 SI/Silicone rubber
 Leather
 Fluorine Plastic Type:
 FEP, with EPDM backing
 PTFE, with EPDM backing
 PFA, with EPDM backing

Applications 
Diaphragm Valves are ideally suited for:

 Corrosive applications, where the body and diaphragm materials can be chosen for chemical compatibility. (E.G. Acids, Bases etc.)
 Abrasive applications, where the body lining can be designed to withstand abrasion and the diaphragm can be easily replaced once worn out
 Solids entrained liquids, since the diaphragm can seal around any entrained solids and provide positive seal
 Slurries, since the diaphragm can seal around entrained solids and provide positive seal

Markets 
Diaphragm valves have many applications in the following markets:

 Water and Wastewater
 Power
 Pulp and Paper
 Chemical
 Cement
 Mining and Minerals
 Pharmaceutical and Bioprocessing

See also 

 Ball valve
 Butterfly valve
 Control valve
 Gate valve
 Globe valve
 Needle valve
 Pinch valve

References

External links
History of the diaphragm valve
 Internal Structure of the diaphragm valve
Pneumatic Actuators for diaphragm valves

Plumbing valves
Valves